Sibley is a village in Ford County, Illinois, United States. The population was 272 at the 2010 census.

History
The site of Sibley was laid out for Michael L. Sullivant, the namesake of Sullivant Township, in 1877. Sullivant sold the land to Hiram Sibley in 1878. The post office was established in 1873 under the name Burr Oaks, but was renamed Sibley in 1880.

Geography

Demographics

As of the census of 2000, there were 329 people, 137 households, and 99 families residing in the village. The racial makeup of the village was 97.87% White, 0.30% Native American, 0.30% from other races, and 1.52% from two or more races. Hispanic or Latino of any race were 1.52% of the population.

There were 137 households, out of which 28.5% had children under the age of 18 living with them, 59.9% were married couples living together, 9.5% had a female householder with no husband present, and 27.7% were non-families. 27.0% of all households were made up of individuals, and 16.8% had someone living alone who was 65 years of age or older.  The average household size was 2.40 and the average family size was 2.84.

In the village, the population was spread out, with 24.3% under the age of 18, 5.5% from 18 to 24, 27.4% from 25 to 44, 18.5% from 45 to 64, and 24.3% who were 65 years of age or older.  The median age was 42 years. For every 100 females, there were 98.2 males.  For every 100 females age 18 and over, there were 93.0 males.

The median income for a household in the village was $31,667, and the median income for a family was $42,500. Males had a median income of $29,167 versus $20,547 for females. The per capita income for the village was $21,317.  About 4.5% of families and 7.4% of the population were below the poverty line, including 8.8% of those under age 18 and 2.4% of those age 65 or over.

Sibley was once cited on Ripley's Believe It or Not! as the home of the largest corn crib in the World with a capacity of 125,000 bushels. However, it was demolished in 1965.

References

Villages in Ford County, Illinois
Villages in Illinois
Populated places established in 1877
1877 establishments in Illinois